1-Naphthylamine is an aromatic amine derived from naphthalene. It can cause bladder cancer (transitional cell carcinoma). It crystallizes in colorless needles which melt at 50 °C. It possesses a disagreeable odor, sublimes readily, and turns brown on exposure to air.  It is the precursor to a variety of dyes.

Preparation and reactions
It can be prepared by reducing 1-nitronaphthalene with iron and hydrochloric acid followed by steam distillation. 

Oxidizing agents, such as ferric chloride, give a blue precipitate with solutions of its salts. Chromic acid converts it into 1-naphthoquinone. Sodium in boiling amyl alcohol
reduces the unsubstituted ring, giving tetrahydro-1-naphthylamine. This tetrahydro compound yields adipic acid when oxidized by potassium permanganate. 

At 200 °C in sulfuric acid, it converts to 1-naphthol.

Use in dyes
The sulfonic acid derivatives of 1-naphthylamine are used for the preparation of azo dye.  These compounds possess the important property of dyeing unmordanted cotton. 

An important derivative is naphthionic acid (1-aminonaphthalene-4-sulfonic acid), which is produced by heating 1-naphthylamine and sulfuric acid to 170–180 °C in the presence of crystallized oxalic acid. It forms small needles, very sparingly soluble in water. Upon treatment with the bis(diazonium) derivative of benzidine, 1-aminonaphthalene-4-sulfonic acid gives Congo red.

Safety
It is listed as one of the 13 carcinogens covered by the OSHA General Industry Standards.

See also
Used in preparation of aptiganel.

References

Naphthylamines
IARC Group 3 carcinogens
1-Naphthyl compounds